Albert Moses, KStJ (19 December 1937 – 15 September 2017) was a Sri Lankan actor based in the United Kingdom. He is best known for playing the role of Ranjeet Singh, a student in Jeremy Brown's EFL class in the popular British sitcom Mind Your Language and one of four students (along with Giovanni Capello, Juan Cervantes, and Anna Schmidt) to appear in all four series.

Personal life
He was born on 19 December 1937 in Gampola, Kandy. He started to work at the University of Ceylon, Peradeniya. Then he moved to Africa for employment and finally to London to learn drama and theatre. He was fluent in English, Arabic, Tamil, Sinhalese, moderate German and Sanskrit and excellent in fencing, dancing, singing, motor-cycle stunts, karate and judo.

Moses died in September 2017 in London at the age of 79. He was buried at St. Andrew's Church in his native Gampola, Sri Lanka.

Career
He had begun to act by the 1960s in India where he appeared in several Bollywood films, then produced and directed his first. From India, he moved to Africa, where he undertook work on documentaries. From the early 1970s, in Britain, Moses played small parts in several television series before being cast as Ranjeet Singh, a Sikh from Punjab, India, in the ITV sitcom Mind Your Language (1977–1979, 1986). He acted in prominent roles in many theater productions such as Freeway at National Theatre, Phædra Britannica with Dame Diana Rigg and Long March to Jerusalem at Watford Theater. He also produced 13 episodes of Mind Your Language.

His final film was The Snarling (2018), in which he played tribute to his role in An American Werewolf in London (1981). The Snarling is dedicated to his memory.

Selected credits

Theatre
 Freeway - National Theatre;
 Phædra Britannica - National Theatre (with Diana Rigg);
 Long March to Jerusalem - Watford Palace Theatre

Film
 White Cargo (1973) - Arab (uncredited) 
 The Man Who Would Be King (1975, A John Huston film with Sean Connery, Michael Caine and Christopher Plummer) - Ghulam
 Stand Up, Virgin Soldiers (1977, EMI) - Indian shopkeeper
 The Spy Who Loved Me (1977, James Bond film) - Barman
 What's Up Nurse! (1978, a Derek Ford sex comedy) - 1st Asian
 Carry On Emmannuelle (1978, Rank) - Doctor
 The Awakening (1980, Columbia Pictures) - (uncredited)
 An American Werewolf in London (1981, a John Landis movie) - Hospital Porter
 The Great Quest - with Oliver Reed;
 Pink Floyd: The Wall (1982, Alan Parker film) - Janitor
 Octopussy (1983, James Bond film) - Saddrudin - undercover British agent in India
 Al-mas' Ala Al-Kubra (1983) - Indian officer (uncredited)
 Scandalous (1984, with Sir John Gielgud and Pamela Stephenson) - Vishnu
 The Little Drummer Girl (1984, EMI, a George Roy Hill film) - Green Grocer
 Foreign Body (1986) - Paramedic #2
 The Second Jungle Book: Mowgli and Baloo (1997, Columbia Pictures) - Conductor
 East Is East (1999, a BAFTA award-winning Film4 production) - Abdul Karim
 The Snarling (2018) - Hospital Patient

Television
 Queenie - Hollywood mini-series with Kirk Douglas;
 On the Buses - London Weekend Television;
 Warship - BBC television drama;
 Robin's Nest - Thames Television sitcom;
 Mind Your Language - London Weekend Television sitcom (nearly 50 episodes broadcast between 1977 and 1986);
 Juliet Bravo - BBC television drama;
 The Jewel in the Crown - Granada Television (4 episodes, with Charles Dance, OBE);
 The Little and Large Show - BBC television comedy;
 The Benny Hill Show - Thames Television comedy;
 Boon - ITV Central drama;
 The Bill - talkbackTHAMES television drama (5 episodes);
 Never the Twain - Thames Television sitcom;
 The Adventures of Sherlock Holmes: The Man With The Twisted Lip - Granada Television;
 London's Burning - London Weekend Television drama;
 Tandoori Nights - Channel 4
 Crocodile Shoes (Adrian Lynn's accountant)

Other

 Produced 13 episodes of Mind Your Language;
 Produced and directed Gabriella, a television film produced on location in Malta;
 Hosted, produced and directed a talent contest variety show
 Wrote The Seventh Commandment, a television drama;
 Wrote Side by side, a television comedy;
 Wrote Don't talk to strangers, a television thriller;
 Wrote The Jokers, a television drama;
 Published children's books Tales from India, The hawk and the turtles, and Mustapha Mouse goes to the city;
 Published a book of 87 poems
 Past chairman of the Asian, Caribbean, Oriental and Asian Artistes of EQUITY.
 Ex-governor of a St Albans school.
 Was on board of directors for a St Albans theatre company.
 Past member of the London regional committee of ITV under the chairmanship of Lord Lipsey.
 Past chairman of the St Albans Film Society.
 Trustee and patron of the Ivy Trust, a children's charity.
 Volunteered at a local hospital.
 Volunteered at a local school, running a film workshop for children.
 Volunteered at a local retirement home.
 Retired voluntary teacher from a local college, teaching English to foreign students. (See the Mind Your Language page for the irony of this!)
 Moses was a Knight of the Order of St John.

References

External links
 Official website
 
 An interview with Albert Moses about 007

1937 births
2017 deaths
People from British Ceylon
Knights of the Order of St John
Sri Lankan emigrants to the United Kingdom
Sri Lankan male film actors
Sri Lankan male television actors
20th-century Sri Lankan male actors
21st-century Sri Lankan male actors